The 104th edition of the Tour of Flanders one-day cycling classic was held on 18 October 2020, as the 20th event of the 2020 UCI World Tour. The race started in Antwerp and finished in Oudenaarde, Belgium, covering a distance of 241 km. Mathieu van der Poel of the Netherlands won the race, just ahead of Belgian Wout van Aert.

The race was originally scheduled on 5 April 2020, serving as the 14th event of the 2020 UCI World Tour, but was postponed due to the COVID-19 pandemic On 17 March 2020 the organisers announced the race would not run on the planned date; on 5 May it was rescheduled for 18 October. The men's event was slightly reduced in distance, because of the unprecedented end-of-season slot and in order to deal with the intense October campaign.

Teams

The teams participating in the race were:

UCI WorldTeams

 
 
 
 
 
 
 
 
 
 
 
 
 
 
 
 
 
 
 

UCI Professional Continental teams

Result

Notes

References

External links

2020 UCI World Tour
2020 in Belgian sport
2020
October 2020 sports events in Belgium
Cycling events postponed due to the COVID-19 pandemic